Naturum Sommen is a visitor center and natural history museum located in Torpön Island in Lake Sommen in the South Swedish highlands. The building is modelled after a traditional boathouse. The idea of a naturum museum was first conceived in 1996 and the museum was inaugurated in 2002. From the beginning, the museum has been supported by the local history society of Torpön. In late 2013 Naturum Sommen closed as the local history society of Torpön and the Sommen Foundation were not able to continue its support, however it opened again in 2014.

Since 2017, the Ydre municipality heads the work in Sommen Naturum.

References 

Museums established in 2002
Natural history museums in Sweden
2002 establishments in Sweden
Museums in Östergötland County
Nature centers